Ziegler is a common German-language surname meaning "brick-maker" and may refer to the following people:

Actors
Ernst Ziegler (1894–1974), German actor
Lulu Ziegler (1903–1973), Danish actress
Matilda Ziegler (born 1964), English actress
Maddie Ziegler (born 2002), American dancer and actress
Mackenzie Ziegler (born 2004), American dancer and actress

Authors
Calvin Ziegler (1854–1930), Pennsylvanian poet
Christiana Mariana von Ziegler (1695–1760), German poet

Fictional characters
Morgan Ziegler, a.k.a. Zitz in the Battletoads series
Toby Ziegler, White House Communications Director in American TV series The West Wing
Angela Ziegler, a.k.a. Mercy in Overwatch
Victor Ziegler, wealthy member of New York's elite in Eyes Wide Shut
Werner Ziegler, German construction engineer in Better Call Saul

Military
David Ziegler (1748–1811), military officer of the Continental Army, Society of the Cincinnati
Joachim Ziegler (1904–1945), SS-Brigadeführer and recipient of the Knight's Cross of the Iron Cross with Oak Leaves
William Smith Ziegler (1911–1999), Canadian general in World War II

Musicians
Anne Ziegler (1910–2003), English singer, wife of Webster Booth
Klaus Martin Ziegler (1929–1993), German choral conductor, organist and Protestant church musician
Delores Ziegler (born 1951), American mezzo-soprano
Adrian von Ziegler (born 1989), Swiss musician

Politicians
A. H. Ziegler (1889–1972), American lawyer and politician
Bob Ziegler (1921–1991), American lawyer and politician, son of A. H. Ziegler
Dagmar Ziegler (born 1960), German politician
Erich Ziegler (1914–2004), German politician and anti-Nazi resistance activist
Kay-Uwe Ziegler (born 1963), German politician
Ron Ziegler (1939–2003), Richard Nixon's press secretary and assistant to the president

Religion
Gregorius Thomas Ziegler (1770–1852), Benedictine monk and bishop of Linz
Ignaz Ziegler (1861–1948), Austrian rabbi
Jacob Ziegler (c. 1470 – 1549), German humanist and theologian, itinerant scholar of geography and cartographer

Scientists and academics
 Daniel Ziegler (1804–1876), American clergyman and entomologist
 Günter M. Ziegler (born 1963), German mathematician
 Heinz Otto Ziegler (1903–1944), German speaking Czech political scientist
 Jean Ziegler (born 1934), Swiss professor of sociology and politician, active in the anti-globalization movement
 John Bosley Ziegler, American physician who pioneered the athletic use of the steroid Dianabol
 Karl Ziegler (1898–1973), German chemist and Nobel laureate
 Peter Ziegler (1928–2013), Swiss geologist
 Philip Ziegler (born 1929), British biographer and historian
 Regina G. Ziegler, American biochemist and nutritional epidemiologist 
 Tamar Ziegler (born 1971), Israeli mathematician
 Willi Ziegler (1929–2002), a German paleontologist
 William Ziegler (1843–1905), American industrialist, co-founder of the Royal Baking Powder Company, Arctic explorer

Sports
Brad Ziegler (born 1979), American baseball player
Edi Ziegler (1930–2020), German road cyclist
Gus Ziegler (1875–1960), American college football coach
John Ziegler Jr. (1934–2018), American lawyer and former president of the National Hockey League
Kate Ziegler (born 1988), American swimmer
Larry Ziegler (born 1939), American golfer
Marc Ziegler (born 1976), German footballer
Patrick Ziegler (born 1990), German-Australian footballer
Reto Ziegler (born 1986), Swiss footballer
Reto Ziegler (curler), Swiss curler
Thomas Ziegler (ice hockey) (born 1978), Swiss hockey player
Thomas Ziegler (cyclist) (born 1980), German road racing cyclist

Technicians
Bernard Ziegler (1933–2021), French, former Airbus director of engineering, son of Henri Ziegler
Hans K. Ziegler (1911–1999), German pioneer in the field of satellite technology

Others
Adolf Ziegler (1892–1959), German painter, favoured by Adolf Hitler
Anne Ziegler (1910–2003), English singer (born Irene Eastwood)
Christian Ziegler, German photojournalist
Elizabeth Ziegler (1854–1942), Canadian schoolteacher
Henri Ziegler (1906–1998), French, Airbus first CEO
John Ziegler (talk show host) (born 1967), radio talk show host in Los Angeles
Pablo Ziegler (born 1944), Argentine composer
Regina Ziegler (born 1944), German producer

Other uses
Ziegler, Wisconsin, ghost town, United States
Ziegler House (Ketchikan, Alaska), NRHP-listed in Ketchikan Gateway Borough, Alaska, associated with A. H. and Bob Ziegler
Ziegler–Natta catalyst, chemical reagent named after Karl Ziegler and Giulio Natta
Ziegler School of Rabbinic Studies, graduate program at the American Jewish University in Los Angeles
Ziegler Cray Y-MP M90 NSA supercomputer, now at National Cryptologic Museum
Ziegler & Co., manufacturer and distributor of Persian carpets
Zig Ziglar, American personality

Occupational surnames
German-language surnames